The Royal New Zealand Coastguard (informally Coastguard New Zealand) is the primary civilian marine search and rescue organisation for New Zealand. Unlike a number of other countries, the organisation is a non-governmental, civilian charitable organisation, with no enforcement powers. Uniformed agencies of the New Zealand government, including the police, Maritime New Zealand and customs, manage New Zealand's maritime law enforcement and border control. Coastguard New Zealand has a strong focus on boating education.

History 
Sea rescue services have existed in some shape or form in New Zealand since at least 1861, but it was not until some time later that the modern Coastguard New Zealand was formed.

1970s 
 Following tragic events such as the Wahine disaster, various local groups that had been operating separately recognised a need for a unified, national organisation and so they formed the "New Zealand Coastguard Federation" in 1976.
 Units began offering training and education to local boaties in an effort to reduce incidents since at least 1979.

1980s 
 Radio communications are introduced and play a large part in assisting with search and rescue events.
 Name changes to "Royal New Zealand Coastguard Federation" in 1986 as the charity is granted Royal Patronage, with Prince Charles as the Patron.

1990s 
 First Air Patrol unit is introduced in 1991 which means that for the first time in New Zealand survivors would be able to be seen from the sky as a part of Coastguard search and rescue incidents.
 "Nowcasting" service was introduced in Auckland in 1992. This was different from simply broadcasting a forecast as weather measuring instruments had also been installed. This was later rolled out through the rest of the country.

2000s 
 Dropped "Federation" from the name in 2005.
 Began charging a call-out rate per-hour to non-members in 2006.
 Calls were made for government funding in 2007.
 Law changes were passed in 2008 requiring Auckland councils to provide funding for, among other things, including Coastguard Northern Region. For more info, see Auckland Regional Amenities Funding Act 2008.

Organisation 
The Coastguard in New Zealand is a civilian charity made up of volunteers. There are four Coastguard regions (Northern, Eastern, Central and Southern), with 63 units between these regions.

Incident types 
The type of incident will influence a number of factors, such as who is in control of the incident and who will pay for the incident. Other organisations may also become involved in an incident including:
 New Zealand Defence Force
 Fire and Emergency New Zealand
 NZ Land Search & Rescue
 Civil Aviation Authority

Category 1 (New Zealand Police) 
Some examples of a Category 1 incident are:
 Person on-board vessel is overdue
 Death near shore
 Usually on-land or within a few miles of the shore
Typically require the use of local personnel and resources and can be carried out efficiently and effectively at the local level.

Category 2 (Rescue Coordination Centre New Zealand) 
Some examples of a Category 2 incident are:
 Marine EPIRB (beacon) activated
 Plane crash
 May be coordinated internationally or several miles off the shore

Coastguard non-emergency assistance 
Coastguard also provides non-urgent assistance within 12 nautical miles of the coast and 30 miles of a Coastguard unit, such as breakdown assistance, at no additional cost to members. Coastguard membership is $115 per year (as of 2021). However, this non-urgent assistance is chargeable for non-members. The current rate is $280 per hour (from the time the rescue vessel leaves the dock until the time it arrives back). The costs incurred for emergency services provided by Coastguard are covered by Police or Rescue Coordination Centre, not the person in distress.

Mission, vision and focus 
The vision of the organisation is "No boaties’ lives lost at sea" with the mission "To be the ‘go to’ people for marine safety, education and search and rescue services".

The focuses for Coastguard New Zealand currently are:
 Our People
 Community
 Financial
 Reputation

Personnel 
A large number of volunteers make up the organisation, alongside a small number of paid staff. In 2016, there was 2235 volunteers and 23 paid staff, made up of 13 Coastguard staff and 10 Coastguard Boating Education staff. The organisation is made up of a large number of different roles, both on-shore and as SAR crew.

Becoming a volunteer 
As a charity, Coastguard requires volunteer crew in order to continue their operations. Many rural units need crew now, with some urban areas operating a wait list instead. Interested people can apply on the How do I become a Coastguard volunteer? website. Applicants need to pass a "police vet". This is more stringent than just a regular criminal convictions check as crew may work with vulnerable people.

SAR Crew 
Units require people to attend search and rescue events as they may arise.

Rescue Vessel Crew 
Involves being a crew member onboard a Coastguard Rescue Vessel (CRV). There are many roles on-board, including helmsperson, navigator / radio operator, observer and skipper.

Air Patrol Crew 
Involves being an air observer or tactical officer. The air patrol typically involves small planes.

Shore Crew 
Units require people on-shore to maintain the operations of the unit. This involves operating radios and managing incidents, among other things.

Radio Operator 
Communicates with vessels at sea, including rescues vessels (as well as the public). This role requires the crew member to hold a Maritime VHF Radio Operator Certificate. The role invol

Incident Controller 
Coordinates search and rescues operations. The role is suited to someone who has previous people management experience. This role is especially important when working with other agencies, in which case the Coordinated Information Management System (CIMS) is used.

Training Officer 
Plans and manages the delivery of training to the unit and ensures the crew remains competent. This role also involving assessing crew and reporting results.

Safety Officer 
Manages unit compliance with the Health and Safety in Employment Act, as well as the Maritime Transport Act and the general Health and Safety needs of the unit. The role encompasses the vessel, buildings and crew & may also involve maintaining relationships with WorkSafe New Zealand and Maritime New Zealand.

Asset Manager 
Manages on-going repairs and maintenance for the units buildings, vessels and vehicles.

Crew Manager 
Represent the crew members to the board and maintains the crews welfare.

Unit Management and Administration 
The individual units of the Coastguard each have a treasurer, as well as a number of other roles. The units also take some responsibility for fundraising in their community.

Equipment

Boats 

All units operate small, medium and large marine rescue vessels, mostly over nine metres but depending on the place they could have smaller vessels. They are specially equipped with rescue equipment, such as:
 Life rings
 Medical Kit
 Oxygen Kit
 Defibrillators
 Boat hooks
 Throw bags
 Radar, compass and GPS

Aircraft 
Today two Air Patrol units exist under the Coastguard banner presently, Auckland Air Patrol and Northland Air Patrol. Together, they responded to 76 calls for assistance and assisted 155 people in 2016. Previously an Air Patrol existed in the South Island. This has now been disestablished due to a lack of funding. Assistance is still able to be provided in the event of an emergency to the South island but this is now typically provided by helicopters based out of Christchurch.

Uniforms 
Crew members are provided with a distinctive red uniform that is suitable for challenging marine conditions. Some of the clothing includes:
 Wet weather jacket
 Overalls
 Life jacket
 Sea boots
 Marine grab bag (backpack)

Services

Marine VHF radio 
A number of services are provided by the Coastguard via. marine VHF radio. The person operating the VHF radio is required to hold a Maritime VHF Radio Operator Certificate (unless they are under supervision by someone who holds one or they are making an emergency call). To contact Coastguard you can call them on Coastguard Radio on a VHF radio, refer to their website. All emergency calls should be made on marine VHF channel 16. The channel is monitored by the Rescue Coordination Centre New Zealand and the Coastguard Marine Rescue Centre. Nearby vessels are also encouraged to listen on the channel for any distress calls.

Marine Weather 
Provides up-to-date marine weather for all of New Zealand. This is also known as "nowcasting". The channels used for the Marine Weather service are available on the Coastguard website.

Trip Reports and Bar Crossing 
Provides ability to lodge a trip report. It is a good idea to do a trip report when departing on the water and when crossing a bar. You should always remember to close your trip report when you arrive back safely or when you cross the bar. In the event that an alarm is raised, search and rescue teams will have information available to assist them with the rescue. The channels used for the Trip Reports service are available on the Coastguard website. The information collected includes:
 Boat name and callsign
 Where you are travelling to
 Number of People onboard (POB)
 When you plan to arrive

Coastguard Boating Education 
Coastguard New Zealand operates a subsidiary, Coastguard Boating Education (CBE). The organisation runs education events, such as classes for female skippers, and two Hauraki Gulf cruises highlighting popular anchorages and hazard awareness. Many courses are offered with a number being NZQA-accredited. Some of the most popular courses include:
 Day Skipper
 Boatmaster
 Maritime VHF Radio Operator Certificate
 Maritime Restricted Radio Operator Certificate (MRROC)
More information is available on the Coastguard Boating Education website.

Coastguard App For Mobile Phones 
Available on platforms such as Android and iOS there is a Coastguard application available to download, this application can give you access to be able to log a trip with Coastguard without having to call Coastguard Radio on the phone of on the VHF radio. It can also give the weather information for your local area and give you other information such as Coastguard Radio map. It also can provide tidal information and allow you to plot locations on a map for memory, for an example fishing spots, etc.

Old4New lifejacket replacement programme 
As part of a water safety campaign, Coastguard is conducting a programme where old, and oftentimes unserviceable, lifejackets can be replaced at a lower cost than the retail price. More information is available on the Old4New website.

Statistics

Financials 
In the 2018 financial year, Coastguard New Zealand received $10.6m in income and had $9.9m in expenses.

Income (in 2018) 
 47% Grants
 27% Lottery ticket sales
 10% Examination fees
 13% Donations
 1% Sale of publications
 2% Interest and other income

Expenses (in 2018) 
 42% Support for regions and units
 17% Direct lottery expenditure
 16% Professional services and other costs
 13% Income stream development
 6% Boating Education services
 3% Public safety and communications
 2% Accommodation
 1% Governance and AGM

Volunteers and rescues

In the media

2016 
 Coastguard rescues drunks from island after party of 500 gets out of hand
 Boat capsizes off Northland coast
 Pair rescued from troubled boat listing in darkness on Lake Taupo

2017 
 US Coastguard to the 'rescue' in Auckland exercises

See also 
 Rescue Coordination Centre New Zealand
 Maritime New Zealand

References

External links
  Official website

Government agencies established in 1976
Coast guards
Emergency services in New Zealand
Organisations based in New Zealand with royal patronage
1976 establishments in New Zealand